Bernard Joecel Forbes (born March 27, 1998) is a Filipino actor. He first appeared on TV as a contestant in That's My Boy on Eat Bulaga!.; however, he become a finalist and also he didn't win.

Career
After his stint on That's My Boy, he found fame through a Tide commercial in which he played a character named Tolits. He soon became one of the hosts of GMA Network's Eat Bulaga!.

Apart from Eat Bulaga!, he has appeared in TV shows such as Ful Haus, Encantadia, Etheria, and Fantastikids. He has also been featured in movies such as Ispiritista: Itay, may moomoo!—for which he won the Best Child Actor award in the 24th Luna Awards--Exodus: Tales from the Enchanted Kingdom, Enteng Kabisote 3, Paraiso, Dobol Trobol, and Ded Na si Lolo. He has also lent his voice to the character of Botyok in the animated movie Urduja.

Filmography

Film

Television

Discography
Tolits - Dance Hits  (2006)

Accolades

Awards and nominations

External links

1998 births
Living people
People from Rizal
Filipino male child actors
Filipino male television actors
Filipino male voice actors
Filipino male film actors

Filipino television variety show hosts
GMA Network personalities
TV5 (Philippine TV network) personalities
ABS-CBN personalities